Queen Latifah is an American Golden Globe Award, Grammy Award, and Primetime Emmy Award-winning rapper, singer, and actress.

Academy Awards

American Black Film Festival

BAFTA Awards

BET Awards 
The BET Awards were established in 2001 by the Black Entertainment Television network.

|-
| 2003 
| Chicago 
| rowspan=3| Best Actress 
| 
|-
| 2004
| Bringing Down the House & Brown Sugar
| 
|-
|rowspan=2| 2005
| Taxi & Beauty Shop
| 
|-
| The Cookout 
| Outstanding Writing for a Theatrical Film
| 
|-
| 2006 
| Last Holiday 
| Best Actress 
| 
|-
| 2008 
| Life Support 
| Best Actress 
| 
|-
| 2021
| Herself 
| Icon Award 
|

Black Movie Awards

Black Reel Awards

Black Reel Awards for Television

Critics' Choice Award

Critics' Choice Television Award

Elle Women in Hollywood Awards

Essence Black Women in Hollywood

Golden Globe Awards

Gracie Allen Awards

Grammy Awards

Hollywood Film Awards

Hollywood Walk of Fame

Image Awards

Indie Awards

Independent Spirit Awards

Kids' Choice Awards

MTV Movie & TV Awards

Primetime Emmy Awards

Palm Springs International Film Festival

People's Choice Awards

Phoenix Film Critics Society Award

Satellite Awards

Screen Actors Guild Awards

Soul Train Music Awards

Teen Choice Awards

Women Film Critics Circle Awards

Notes

References

External links
 Official website

Awards
Lists of awards received by American actor
Lists of awards received by American musician